Beauty's Worth is a 1922 American romantic comedy drama film directed by Robert G. Vignola, starring Marion Davies as an unsophisticated Quaker who ventures to a seaside resort, meets a Bohemian artist, and falls in love.

Plot
As described in a film magazine, Prudence Cole (Davies), a young Quaker woman, has been raised by her two severe maiden aunts, Elizabeth (Mattox) and Cynthia Whitney (Manning). She is permitted to visit the Garrisons, the mother (Shattuck) and her grown son Henry (Cooley), at an ultra fashionable resort, where her precise mannerisms make her the center of amused attention. Henry, whom she had hoped to marry, all but ignores her. Artist and thinker Cheyne Rovein (Stanley) senses the young woman's position and selects her for the leading role in elaborate charades which he stages, designing costumes and coaching her as to conduct. On this night she outshines her critics, wins the admiration of the men and the enmity of the women, and the dallying Henry returns to pay her court. The following morning she refuses him and promises to marry Cheyne.

Cast
 Marion Davies as Prudence Cole
 Forrest Stanley as Cheyne Rovein
 June Elvidge as Amy Tillson
 Truly Shattuck as Mrs. Garrison
 Lydia Yeamans Titus as Jane
 Hallam Cooley as Henry Garrison
 Antrim Short as Tommy
 Thomas Jefferson as Peter
 Martha Mattox as Aunt Elizabeth Whitney
 Aileen Manning as Aunt Cynthia Whitney
 Gordon Dooley as Doll (in charade scene)
 Johnny Dooley as Soldier (in charade scene)

Production 
In her 13th film, Marion Davies re-teamed with Forrest Stanley for this romantic comedy/drama. Location shooting was again at Point Lobos on the Monterey Peninsula. The centerpiece of the film is the stunning "tableaux vivants" in which Davies recreates her dancing doll routine from the 1916 edition of the Ziegfeld Follies. The pageant was once again designed by Joseph Urban. The pageant scenes were originally tinted.

Status
A DVD of the film was released by Edward Lorusso with a music score by Ben Model in December 2016.

Legacy
On August 11, 2018 the film has been shown in Robert G. Vignola's birthplace Trivigno, with the collaboration of Pordenone Silent Film Festival, as part of a project to recover Vignola's activity. It has been scored live by Stephen Horne and the "Zerorchestra" ensemble from Pordenone.

References

External links

 
 
 Beauty's Worth at silentera.com
 
 

American silent feature films
American black-and-white films
Films about Quakers
Films based on short fiction
Films directed by Robert G. Vignola
1920s romantic comedy-drama films
American romantic comedy-drama films
Surviving American silent films
1922 comedy films
1922 drama films
1922 films
1920s American films
1920s English-language films
Silent romantic comedy-drama films
Silent American comedy-drama films